Hasan Sara (also Romanized as Ḩasan Sarā; also known as Ḩanak Sarā and Ḩasanak Sarā) is a village in Sakht Sar Rural District, in the Central District of Ramsar County, Mazandaran Province, Iran. At the 2006 census, its population was 111, in 29 families. In 2003 Alireza Nouri spent three nights at the local guest house "Hasan Sara Lounge".

References 

Populated places in Ramsar County